is an autobahn in southwestern Germany. It connects the Taunus to Fulda, passing close to Frankfurt am Main. The first part of the autobahn between Wiesbaden and the Nordwestkreuz Frankfurt, was opened as early as 1934, then called the Rhein-Main-Schnellweg. It became an autobahn in 1965.

The autobahn is incomplete; there still is a gap within Frankfurt city borders. A tunnel was proposed as a solution; however, this has not been implemented because of the high cost of construction. A new section of roadway to close a second gap southwest of Fulda was opened to traffic on 13 September 2014. The section includes a  cut-and-cover tunnel and replaces a diversion which saw traffic routed onto the B 40 for approximately 9 kilometers before rejoining the A 66 just prior to the junction with the A 7; the new segment cost 154 million euros. A portion of the Kinzig Valley Railway line was also rerouted along the new autobahn segment, which required an additional 60 million euros.

Near Frankfurt-Höchst, the highway is one of the busiest in Germany with an average of more than 130,000 vehicles per day.

Exit list 

|-
|colspan="3"|

 

  

 

  

  

 /Erlensee

 

 

 

 

 
 
 
 

 

 

 

 

|}

References

External links 

66
A066